Pauline Mary Joan Goodwin (née Squires, born 28 May 1946) is a British retired slalom and sprint canoeist who competed in the 1960s and the 1970s. She finished 21st in the K-1 event at the 1972 Summer Olympics in Munich. Four years later in Montreal, Goodwin was eliminated in the semifinals of the K-2 500 m event but set a new British record with Hilary Bosher (née Peacock).

She is the first woman to canoe 225 miles of the Colorardo River, Grand Canyon, United States in July 1971. She is also the only British paddler (man or woman) to have competed in the British Teams in all four categories of canoeing i.e. Sprint, Marathon, Wild Water Racing and Slalom. She took part in Slalom and Sprinting at 1972 and 1976 Olympic Games respectively. Goodwin remains competitive as a hill climber and circuit racing driver in a Ferrari 328 since 2005.

References
Pauline Goodwin-Squires's profile at Sports Reference.com

1946 births
Living people
Canoeists at the 1972 Summer Olympics
Canoeists at the 1976 Summer Olympics
Olympic canoeists of Great Britain
British female canoeists